Hikr Bayt Atiq is a Syrian village located in Ayn Halaqim Nahiyah in Masyaf District, Hama. According to the Syria Central Bureau of Statistics (CBS), Hikr Bayt Atiq had a population of 336 in the 2004 census.

References 

Populated places in Masyaf District